Nahr-e Seyyed Yusef (also Romanized as Nahr-e Seyyed Yūsef; also known as Seyyed Yūsef) is a village in Nasar Rural District, Arvandkenar District, Abadan County, Khuzestan Province, Iran. At the 2006 census, its population was 132, in 24 families.

References 

Populated places in Abadan County